The bundharma's murex (Chicoreus bundharmai) is a species of sea snail, a marine gastropod mollusk in the family Muricidae, the murex snails or rock snails.

Description
The size of an adult shell varies between 50mm and 140mm.

Distribution
This marine species occurs off Kalimantan, Indonesia and in the South China Sea off Vietnam.

References

 Houart, R., 1992. Description of a new species of Chicoreus (s.s.) (Gastropoda: Muricidae) from Kalimantan (Borneo). Apex 7(1): 27-30

External links
 

Muricidae
Gastropods described in 1992